Naughty Professor is a 2012 Malayalam adult sex comedy film written by Baburaj and directed by Hari Narayanan. It stars Baburaj and Lakshmi Gopalaswamy in the lead roles along with Innocent, Lena, Tini Tom, Janardhanan, Sandhya and Malavika Nair who form the rest of the star cast.

Plot
Professor Viswambaran works at Viswa Jyothi Engineering College, Thodupuzha. Over-consciousness about his beauty and glamour gives him a "naughty professor" image in the college. His wife Karthika, a former actress, had decided to discontinue her acting career to settle down with her husband. Viswambaran often feels overshadowed by his wife's fame and name. It is during this time Viswambharan's old nemesis Chacko a.k.a. David and his wife Tessa come as their neighbours. The twist and turns in Viswambharan's married life that follow form the crux of the story.

Cast
 Baburaj as Prof. Viswambaran
 Lakshmi Gopalaswamy as Karthika / Viswambaran's wife
 Innocent as Mulavarikkal Francis
 Tini Tom as Chacko
 Lena as Tessa, Chacko's wife
 Janardhanan
 Zeenath
 Malavika Nair
 Dharmajan
 Praveen Prem
 Shine Tom Chacko
 Krishna Prabha
 Mythili (cameo)
 Shafna (cameo)
 Vishnupriya (cameo)

Music
"Jig Jinga" - Jyotsna, Shami Samad
"Thalam Thiruthalam" - Manjari, Jassie Gift

References

External links

2010s Malayalam-language films
2012 films
Films scored by Jassie Gift